Marian Constantin Constantinescu (born 8 August 1981) is a Romanian former professional footballer who played as a striker for teams such as Politehnica Timișoara, Inter Curtea de Argeș, Ceahlăul Piatra Neamț, FC Brașov, Concordia Chiajna or Corona Brașov, among others.

Club career

Concordia Chiajna
Constantinescu made a free transfer from FC Brașov to his current club Concordia Chiajna on 1 July 2016, where he has since made 23 league appearances, providing 2 goals.

On 18 September 2016, Constantinescu helped his side achieve a draw against CS U Craiova with a dipping bicycle kick that came in the 75th minute of the match, which earned his team their 8th point of the season.

References

External links
 
 

1981 births
Living people
Footballers from Bucharest
Romanian footballers
Liga I players
Liga II players
FC Brașov (1936) players
ASC Daco-Getica București players
FC Politehnica Timișoara players
FC CFR Timișoara players
ACF Gloria Bistrița players
CSM Jiul Petroșani players
FC Internațional Curtea de Argeș players
CS Otopeni players
CSM Ceahlăul Piatra Neamț players
CS Concordia Chiajna players
LPS HD Clinceni players
AFC Turris-Oltul Turnu Măgurele players
CSM Corona Brașov footballers
Association football forwards